Akira Nakamura may refer to:

, Japanese academic
, Japanese baseball outfielder
Akira Nakamura (runner) (born 1967), Japanese distance runner and competitor at the 1991 World Championships